The following outline is provided as an overview of and topical guide to electrical engineering.

Electrical engineering – field of engineering that generally deals with the study and application of electricity, electronics and electromagnetism. The field first became an identifiable occupation in the late nineteenth century after commercialization of the electric telegraph and electrical power supply. It now covers a range of subtopics including power, electronics, control systems, signal processing and telecommunications.

Classification 

Electrical engineering can be described as all of the following:

 Academic discipline – branch of knowledge that is taught and researched at the college or university level. Disciplines are defined (in part), and recognized by the academic journals in which research is published, and the learned societies and academic departments or faculties to which their practitioners belong.
 Branch of engineering – discipline, skill, and profession of acquiring and applying scientific, economic, social, and practical knowledge, in order to design and build structures, machines, devices, systems, materials and processes.

Branches of electrical engineering 
 Power engineering
 Control engineering
 Electronic engineering
 Microelectronics
 Signal processing
 Telecommunications engineering
 Instrumentation engineering
 Computer engineering
 Electro-Optical Engineering
 Distribution engineering

Related disciplines 
 Biomedical engineering
 Engineering physics
 Mechanical engineering
 Mechatronics

History of electrical engineering 

History of electrical engineering
Timeline of electrical and electronic engineering

General electrical engineering concepts

Electromagnetism

Electromagnetism
 Electricity
 Magnetism
 Electromagnetic spectrum
 Optical spectrum
 Electrostatics
 Electric charge
 Coulomb's law
 Electric field
 Gauss's law
 Electric potential
 Magnetostatics
 Electric current
 Ampère's law
 Magnetic field
 Magnetic moment
 Electrodynamics
 Lorentz force law
 Electromotive force
 Electromagnetic induction
 Faraday-Lenz law
 Displacement current
 Maxwell's equations
 Electromagnetic field
 Electromagnetic radiation
 Electrical circuits
 Antenna
 Electrical resistance
 Capacitance
 Inductance
 Impedance
 Resonant cavity
 Transmission line
 Waveguide

Physical laws

Physical laws
 Ampère's law
 Coulomb's law
 Faraday's law of induction/Faraday-Lenz law
 Gauss's law
 Kirchhoff's circuit laws
 Current law
 Voltage law
 Maxwell's equations
 Gauss's law
 Faraday's law of induction
 Ampère's law
 Ohm's law

Control engineering

Control engineering
 Control theory
 Adaptive control
 Control theory
 Digital control
 Nonlinear control
 Optimal control
 Intelligent control
 Neural networks
 Fuzzy control
 Model predictive control
 System properties:
 Exponential stability
 Marginal stability
 BIBO stability
 Lyapunov stability (i.e., asymptotic stability)
 Input-to-state (ISS) stability
 Controllability
 Observability
 Negative feedback
 Positive feedback
 System modeling and analysis:
 System identification
 State observer
 First principles modeling
 Least squares
 Kalman filter
 Root locus
 Extended Kalman filter
 Signal-flow graph
 State space representation
 Artificial neural networks
 Controllers:
 Closed-loop controller
 PID controller
 Programmable logic controller
 Embedded controller
 Field oriented controller
 Direct torque controller
 Digital signal controller
 Pulse-width modulation controller
 Control applications:
 Industrial Control Systems
 Process Control
 Distributed Control System
 Mechatronics
 Motion control
 Supervisory control (SCADA)

Electronics

Electronics
 Electrical network/Circuit
 Circuit laws
 Kirchhoff's circuit laws
 Current law
 Voltage law
 Y-delta transform
 Ohm's law
 Electrical element/Discretes
 Passive elements:
 Capacitor
 Inductor
 Resistor
 Hall effect sensor
 Active elements:
 Microcontroller
 Operational amplifier
 Semiconductors:
 Diode
 Zener diode
 Light-emitting diode
 PIN diode
 Schottky diode
 Avalanche diode
 Laser diode
 DIAC
 Thyristor
 Transistor
 Bipolar transistor (BJT)
 Field effect transistor (FET)
 Darlington transistor
 IGBT
 TRIAC
 Mosfet
Electronic design automation

Power engineering

Power engineering
 Generation
 Electrical generator
 Renewable electricity
 Hydropower
 Transmission
 Electricity pylon
 Transformer
 Transmission line
 Distribution
 Processes:
 Alternating current
 Direct current
 Single-phase electric power
 Two-phase electric power
 Three-phase power
 Power electronics / Electro-mechanical
 Inverter
 Static VAR compensator
 Variable-frequency drive
 Ward Leonard control

Electric vehicles

Electric vehicles
 Electric motor
 Hybrid electric vehicle
 Plug-in hybrid
 Rechargeable battery
 Vehicle-to-grid
 Smart Grid

Signal processing

Signal processing
 Analog signal processing
 Digital signal processing
 Quantization
 Sampling
 Analog-to-digital converter, Digital-to-analog converter
 Continuous signal, Discrete signal
 Down sampling
 Nyquist frequency
 Nyquist–Shannon sampling theorem
 Oversampling
 Sample and hold
 Sampling frequency
 Undersampling
 Upsampling
 Audio signal processing
 Audio noise reduction
 Speech processing
 Equalization (audio)
 Digital image processing
 Geometric transformation
 Color correction
 Computer vision
 Image noise reduction
 Edge detection
 Image editing
 Segmentation
 Data compression
 Lossless data compression
 Lossy data compression
 Filtering
 Analog filter
 Audio filter
 Digital filter
 Finite impulse response
 Infinite impulse response
 Electronic filter
 Analogue filter
 Filter (signal processing)
 Band-pass filter
 Band-stop filter
 Butterworth filter
 Chebyshev filter
 High-pass filter
 Kalman filter
 Low-pass filter
 Notch filter
 Sallen Key filter
 Wiener filter
 Transforms
 Advanced Z-transform
 Bilinear transform
 Continuous Fourier transform
 Discrete cosine transform
 Discrete Fourier transform, Fast Fourier transform (FFT)
 Discrete sine transform
 Fourier transform
 Hilbert transform
 Laplace transform, Two-sided Laplace transform
 Z-transform

Instrumentation
 Actuator
 Electric motor
 Oscilloscope

Telecommunication

Telecommunication
 Telephone
 Pulse-code modulation (PCM)
 Main distribution frame (MDF)
 Carrier system
 Mobile phone
 Wireless network
 Optical fiber
 Modulation
 Carrier wave
 Communication channel
 Information theory
 Error correction and detection
 Digital television
 Digital audio broadcasting
 Satellite radio
 Satellite

Electrical engineering occupations 
Occupations in electrical/electronics engineering
Electrical Technologist

Electrical engineering organizations 
International Electrotechnical Commission (IEC)

Electrical engineering publications 

 IEEE Spectrum
 IEEE series of journals  Hawkins Electrical Guide
 Iterative Receiver Design
 Journal of Electrical Engineering

Persons influential in electrical engineering 

List of electrical engineers and their contributions
List of Russian electrical engineers

See also 
Index of electrical engineering articles
Outline of engineering

References

External links 

International Electrotechnical Commission (IEC)
MIT OpenCourseWare in-depth look at Electrical Engineering - online courses with video lectures.
IEEE Global History Network A wiki-based site with many resources about the history of IEEE, its members, their professions and electrical and informational technologies and sciences.

 
 
Electrical engineering
Electrical engineering